KLettres is an educational program that helps the users learn the alphabet as well as pronunciation. It is free and open source software, licensed under the terms of the GPL. The software is part of the KDE Education Project, and is meant to teach very young children aged 2 to 6 years the alphabet. There are currently 4 levels in the game and supports 25 different languages.

Levels 

KLettres features four levels, with settings for adult ("grown up") and children ("kid"). 

 In level 1, the letter is displayed and the user hears it.
 In level 2, the letter is not displayed and the user only hears it.
 In level 3, the syllable is displayed and the user hears it.
 In level 4, the syllable is not displayed and the user only hears it.

Languages supported 

Arabic, Czech, Brazilian Portuguese, Danish, Dutch, British English, English, English Phonix, French, German, Hebrew, Hungarian, Italian, Kannada, Hebrew, Hindi Romanized, Low Saxon, Luganda, Malayalam, Norwegian Bokmål, Punjabi, Spanish, Slovak, Ukrainian and Telugu.

Release history 

 May 13, 2004: v1.3, added Italian and special characters.
 March 8, 2005: Code refactoring, open usability review.
 March 14, 2005: 3 themes included (classroom, arctic and desert).
 March 15, 2005: Added Spanish and Romanized Hindi sounds.
 April 15, 2005: Support for Lunganda.
 July 15, 2006: German sounds added.
 September 23, 2006: Hebrew added.
 February 9, 2007: Low Saxon is added.
 November 2, 2007: 3 languages - Telugu, Kannada and Brazilian Portuguese is added with sound from a 9 year old.
 April 13, 2011: Milestone of 25 languages supported in KLettres.

External links 
 KLettres Project Page

References

Free science software
Free software programmed in C++
Educational software for macOS
Educational software for Windows
Educational software for Linux